Bedtime procrastination is a psychological phenomenon that involves needlessly and voluntarily delaying going to bed, despite foreseeably being worse off as a result. The causes of bedtime procrastination vary from losing sight of the time to staying up later than desired in an attempt to have control over the night due to a perceived lack of influence over events during the day. This latter phenomenon has recently been called revenge bedtime procrastination. Bedtime procrastination has been linked to shorter sleep duration, poorer sleep quality and higher fatigue during the day.

It is most often that people lack sleep not because they cannot fall asleep but because they do not put themselves in the best situation to fall asleep. This suggests that one of the main factors of bedtime procrastination is human behaviour.

Origin of the term

The "revenge" prefix is believed to have been added first in China in the late 2010s, possibly relating to the 996 working hour system (72 hours per week). "Revenge" because many feel that it is the only way they can take any control over their daytime self.

The term "bedtime procrastination" became popular based on a 2014 study from the Netherlands.

Writer Daphne K. Lee popularised the term in a Twitter post using the term "revenge bedtime procrastination" (報復性熬夜), describing it as "a phenomenon in which people who don't have much control over their daytime life refuse to sleep early in order to regain some sense of freedom during late night hours."

Now, defining Bedtime Procrastination is shown in multiple ways like "going to bed later than planned" and "delaying sleep."

Causes 
An individual may procrastinate sleep due to a variety of causes. The person may not consciously be avoiding sleep, but rather continuing to complete activities they perceive as more enjoyable than sleep (such as watching television or browsing social media). There are many distractions in the 21st century: obtaining distractions to delay sleep is much easier than in earlier decades.

Smartphone addiction directly causes bedtime procrastination. People who are addicted to a smartphone are more likely to delay their bedtime because they find it hard to stop using the phone and keep getting distracted by it before going to sleep. Those people enjoy the temporary satisfaction of smartphone use and want more time to entertain themselves. In addition, bedtime procrastination plays a mediated role between smartphone addiction and depression and anxiety. Smartphone addiction results in bedtime procrastination, And then less sleep duration and quality may trigger many negative emotions responsible for depression and anxiety.

Statistics show that disturbed sleep patterns are increasingly common: In 2013, an estimated 40% of U.S. adults slept less than the recommended amount. In Belgium, where data was collected for the study, 30% of adults reported difficulty sleeping, and 13% reported taking sleeping pills.

A 2014 study of Dutch individuals concluded that low self-regulation could cause bedtime procrastination. Due to COVID-19, 40% more people have had sleeping problems. A 2021 study found that boredom also leads to bedtime procrastination. Boredom increases inattention, which leads to increased bedtime procrastination.

Another study in 2014 with 145 people resulted that 43% of the self-labeled bedtime procrastinators did not have a set bedtime or routine. This study suggests and emphasizes that inattention is a big factor of bedtime procrastination. This is because it is not necessary for explicit awareness to be active when procrastinating. People do not procrastinate intentionally, it is a result of poor self-regulation.

A 2018 study which tested 19 people led to three bedtime procrastination themes: deliberate procrastination, mindless procrastination and strategic delay. Deliberate procrastination results from a person consciously believing they deserve more time for themselves, causing them to intentionally stay up later. Mindless procrastination results from losing track of time during one's daily tasks and consequently staying up later without intending to. Strategic delay results from purposely staying up late in order to fall asleep easier. Strategic delay has also been found to be linked with undiagnosed insomnia.

In a 2022 cross-culture research, 210 employees in the United States and 205 employees in China are participated in. The results show that off-time work-related smartphone use may provoke bedtime procrastination. And the negative impact of such smartphone use on bedtime procrastination is more significant in individualist countries such as the United States than in collective countries such as China. In the research, due to different values in two cultures, employees in the United States have a more resistant attitude than employees in China when facing work after hours, resulting in a higher self-control depletion and a higher possibility of bedtime procrastination.

Researches found that bedtime procrastination's main causes are low-self control and increased stress.

Psychological influences 
Bedtime procrastinators engaged in more leisure and social activities in the 3 hours before bedtime. High and low procrastinators spend similar amounts of time watching TV and using computers. In the 3 hours before bedtime, high bedtime procrastinators spent 79.5 minutes on their phones, while low bedtime procrastinators spent 17.6 minutes on their phones. People who stayed up late reported more symptoms of depression and anxiety, lower sleep quality and a higher risk of insomnia than those who didn't go to bed later.

The research conducted in a survey-based study with 317 participants in 2022 has shown that people's subjective perception of time is associated with bedtime procrastination. Sleep time perceived as the end of the day prompts people to think about the rest of their time. In the research, people who procrastinate before sleep often use their evening time to enjoy their favorite activities as a reward for the hard work of the day and tend to focus on immediate rewards and immediate benefits. When people only pursue short-term pleasures, they develop negative attitudes toward time and a poor future time view. Bedtime procrastination causes people to feel that time is passing quickly, which can lead to anxiety and stress.

For people who don't sleep well, bedtime is an abominable time. Sleep can become a task and a burden that increases people's worry about getting enough sleep and leading to nervousness and increases their psychological stress. It can lead to a variety of negative health outcomes, including fatigue, mood swings, and difficulty concentrating.

Women, students, and "night owls" are most likely to experience bedtime procrastination. People with high daytime stress levels are more prone to bedtime procrastination.

Sleep procrastination comes in many other forms as well, such as delaying going to sleep (sleep procrastination) and delaying the time trying to fall asleep (while in bed procrastination).

One third of Chinese students showed signs of sleep procrastination.

Signs and symptoms 
According to researchers, there are three key factors that differentiate between bedtime procrastination and staying up late:

The individual experiencing bedtime procrastination must be decreasing their overall sleep time every night.
There must be no reason for them to stay up late (such as location or sickness).
The individual must be aware that the loss in sleep is impacting them negatively, but they do not care to change their routine.

People with higher cell-phone addiction report more signs of bedtime procrastination. This behaviour has been linked to failures in self-control. The media environment creates the atmosphere for sleep procrastination by providing plenty of fun pastimes before lights out. People use media for gratification and to delay falling asleep. People with low self-control tend to prioritize short-term gains over long-term goals, and people with high self-control are able to resist the temptation of short-term gratification.

Consequences 
A person who experiences bedtime procrastination is likely to face effects related to the delayed sleep. A meta-analysis found that greater bedtime procrastination was associated with poorer sleep quality, shorter sleep duration and increased fatigue throughout the day.

Bedtime procrastination results in poor sleep quality and can be a sign of poor self-regulation.

Bedtime procrastinators are more likely to lose willpower, lose control of themselves, and fidget all the time. It is easy to cause a state of low interest, high dissatisfaction, and high distraction.

Bedtime procrastination can cause sleep deprivation which leads to slow thinking, low attention levels, bad memory, bad decision making, stress, anxiety and irritation. If sleep deprivation is not treated quickly, long term consequences include heart disease, diabetes, obesity, weakened immune system, pain, hormone issues, and mental health issues.

People who have bedtime procrastination lead to short sleep, which can increase people's psychosis and may cause people to suffer from depression.

People who have bed procrastination suffer from sleep disturbance and need medication to fall asleep.

Prevention 
Media use interventions as treatment strategies for sleep insufficiency have been targeted mainly at reducing the volume of media use. This might not be a feasible scenario for the contemporary and future media user anymore, given the immense proliferation of media and the experience of being connected 24/7. Using a self-control perspective on electronic media use and bedtime procrastination could provide novel ways of approaching this issue. As the endpoint of media use (which often implies getting ready to go to bed) is dependent on the level of self-control, strategies aimed at improving self-control could be a valuable avenue for future exploration.

It is highly important to prevent Bedtime procrastination as getting the right amount of sleep is essential for the human body to function properly. Most common consequences of lack of sleep are grogginess, lack of concentration, mood swings and also some long-term detrimental effects affecting both physical and mental health.

Here are a few ways listed to prevent Bedtime procrastination:
 Turning off electronic devices at least one hour before bed. This is because, in a darker environment humans produce the sleep hormone melatonin and therefore, should limit the light they receive before going to sleep.
 Taking a hot shower or bath to reduce stresses.
 Writing down thoughts, feelings, and experiences that stood out throughout the day.
 Have a regular wake-up time and bedtime, including on non-working days.
 Setting a bedtime routine. 
 Snacking on nuts, seeds, and pulses, which are sources of the amino acid tryptophan, which helps produce melatonin.
 Avoiding alcohol or caffeine late in the afternoon or evening.
 Taking melatonin supplements. 
 Time Management. Doing things early in the day so that you are not staying late and losing essential sleep time.
 Taking Vitamin D and magnesium supplements that may help induce sleep.
 Setting boundaries at work.
 Reduce the use of internet.
 Practice time management and priority-setting skills.
 A method called Mental contrasting with implementation intentions (MCII).

References

External links
 Earliest known reference to the term 
Study on why people delay their bedtimes
Bedtime procrastination from smartphone addiction

Sleep disorders